ETB may refer to:

Technology 
 ETB (company), a Colombian telecommunications company
 Electric trolley bus
 Electronic throttle body
 End-of-Transmission-Block character
 Engineering and Technology Board, now EngineeringUK
 Ethernet Train Backbone, a train communication network

Other uses 
 Education and Training Board, a public body in Ireland 
 Endothelin B receptor
 Equitorial Trust Bank, a Nigerian commercial bank
 Etebi language
 Ethiopian birr, the currency of Ethiopia
 Euskal Telebista, a television network in the Basque Autonomous Community
 Elite Trainer Box, special edition Pokémon collector boxes